Våre demoner is the fifth studio album by Norwegian alternative rock group Kaizers Orchestra. Recorded during early 2009, it was released in limited quantities on 27 April 2009. Unlike their four previous albums, the material on Våre demoner consists of re-recorded versions of old material that was never released officially for various reasons. The album's liner notes contain information about how the lyrics relate to one another within the "universe" of the band's songs as well as lyrics.

Background
After the release of Maskineri in 2008, the band toured throughout Europe during fall of that year, playing songs that they had either dropped from their usual set lists a long time prior or had never been played much at all. During this period, rumours began circulating that the band were going to record some of their unrecorded material.

The rumours intensified when, at the beginning of 2009, the band had been spotted in a recording studio in Jæren, Stavanger, Norway. After speculation on the part of the band's fans, information about the album was released on February 14, with a complete track list being released.

Overview
Janove Ottesen has stated that the songs are diverse in origin, with differing styles depending on which era they were from.  Three of the songs originated during the writing sessions for Ompa til du dør ("Gruvene på 16", "Prosessen", "Stormfull vals"), three during the Evig pint period ("Kavalér", "Señor Torpedo", "Sonny"), four from Maestro ("Medisin og psykiatri", "Våre demoner", "Die Polizei", "Fanden hakk i hel"), and two from Maskineri ("Den sjette sansen", "Under månen").

The band stressed that although all of the songs were recorded on demos, this would not be a collection of B-sides, but rather new recordings of old material.  Several songs from the album had already been heard by fans, such as "Die Polizei", "Medisin og psykiatri" and "Den sjette sansen", which they have played live on several occasions, as well as "Våre demoner" and "Stormfull vals", of which some early demos were leaked.  The remainder of the album's tracks were never heard by the public. They recorded the album in more or less one take, recording it as a band and then editing in orchestrated strings, banjo, brass and guest musicians afterwards.

Promotion and release
Shortly after information about the album came to light, the first single, "Die Polizei", was announced. To promote the new single, the band performed the new version of the song at Cafeteateret in Oslo. This performance was recorded and scheduled to be aired on national TV, but it was eventually cut from the programming for reasons unknown. The video was later released online. The single was released in the iTunes Store and several other music stores on 25 March 2009.

On 2 April it was revealed that the various releases of the album would be limited, and that both the vinyl and CD releases would be withdrawn from the market after seven days. On 20 April, as part of a marketing campaign with Platekompaniet, the band released preview versions of two tracks from the album each day, until the day of its release.

On 8 April the band released a half-hour documentary chronicling the history and recording sessions of "Die Polizei", directed by Geir Zahl, one of the band's guitarists and founders.

A week after its release, Våre demoner assumed the number one spot in official Norwegian album charts and "Under månen", a downloadable bonus track, entered the national Top 20 Singles charts at the twentieth spot.

Track listing
All songs written by Janove Ottesen unless otherwise noted. The lyrics are in Norwegian with only some phrases in English.

 "Medisin & psykiatri" (Medicine and Psychiatry) – 4:25
 "Våre demoner" (Our Demons) (Geir Zahl) – 2:40
 "Die Polizei" (The Police) – 4:56
 "Fanden hakk i hel" (The Devil on Our Tails) – 3:55
 "Kavalér" (Dance Partner) – 3:42
 "Gruvene på 16" (The Mines on 16) – 4:40
 "Señor Torpedo" – 3:02
 "Den sjette sansen" (The Sixth Sense) – 3:43
 "Sonny" – 4:12
 "Prosessen" (The Process) – 4:10
 "Stormfull vals" (Stormy Waltz) (Zahl) – 4:42
 "Under månen" (Beneath the Moon) – 5:35

Guest musicians
 Gjertrud Økland – violin & viola
 Bodil Vossgård Mathisrud – cello
 Øyvind Grong – tuba & trombone
 Steven James – French horn
 Jan Kåre Hystad – clarinet
 Ivar Atle Fjordheim – pauker
 Jørgen Sandvik – banjo & nominasjonsukulele on “Prosessen”
 Jan Olav Olsson – banjo on “Stormfull Vals”

References

Kaizers Orchestra albums
2009 albums